Loveman's of Alabama was a Birmingham, Alabama-based chain of department stores with locations across Alabama. It adopted this name to distinguish it from Loveman's department stores operating in Chattanooga, Tennessee, and in Nashville, Tennessee.

History 
The store was founded in 1887, as A.B. Loveman's Dry Goods Emporium at 1915 Second Avenue by Adolph Bernard Loveman. Moses V. Joseph of Selma, Alabama, soon joined the company and it was renamed Loveman & Joseph. In 1889, the company became Loveman, Joseph & Loeb with the addition of Emil Loeb.

Loveman's primary location was built in 1890, at 200 19th Street on the corner of 3rd Avenue North. The store was expanded in 1899. By 1911, Loveman's was known as the largest, most magnificent department store south of the Ohio River. In 1917, an add-on known as the Loveman's annex was built between the main building and the Alabama Theatre.

In 1923, Loveman, Joseph & Loeb, along with B. Lowenstein, Inc., of Memphis, Tennessee, and Maison Blanche Co., of New Orleans, Louisiana, were the first three department stores of the Philadelphia, Pennsylvania-based City Stores Company syndicate.

The department store was destroyed in a massive fire on March 10, 1934, although the exterior of the annex survived. The store reopened within a few weeks at a temporary location while a new Loveman's building was built on the site of the fire. The new Loveman's building was completed in 1935. There was a clock on corner of the new building, facing the 19th Street/3rd Avenue intersection, which was a popular local landmark. The new department store was one of the first in the nation to be air conditioned, and the first in Alabama to feature an escalator.

Loveman's opened its first suburban branch store in Montgomery's Normandale Shopping Center in 1954. In 1966, a store came inline in Huntsville's The Mall. The first Metro Birmingham branch was dedicated, in 1969, at Bessemer's West Lake Mall. Branch stores followed at Fairfield's Western Hills Mall (1970) and Birmingham's Century Plaza (1976).

City Stores filed for Chapter 11 bankruptcy in July 1979, forcing liquidation of the chain and closing of the flagship downtown store in April 1980. The downtown Loveman's building was added to the National Register of Historic Places on April 14, 1983. It now houses the McWane Science Center.

References

Further reading 
The Liebman-Loveman Family, Loveman Merchants Page 1 (retrieved Aug 30, 2008).
 Loveman's. In BhamWiki, part of the "Project to Document the Birmingham District" (retrieved Aug 30, 2008)
Kuhl, Earl D., editor (1934) "Illustrated Souvenir: Birmingham's $3,000,000 Fire, March 10, 1934." Birmingham: Birmingham Firemen's Relief Association. - accessed at Birmingham Public Library Archives Digital Collections, February 22, 2007 
 White, Marjorie Longenecker, ed. (1980) Downtown Birmingham: Architectural and Historical Walking Tour Guide, second edition. Birmingham: Birmingham Historical Society.

External links
Birmingham Rewound - Photographs of Loveman's downtown Birmingham store and opening of Century Plaza store (retrieved Aug 29, 2008).
Archiplanet.org National Register of Historic Places entry (retrieved Aug 30, 2008)
Loveman, Joseph and Loeb Department Store (Birmingham, Ala.). (1936). In Birmingham Public Library Digital Collections. retrieved Aug 30, 2008.

Defunct retail companies of the United States
Companies based in Birmingham, Alabama
Defunct companies based in Alabama
Retail companies established in 1887
1887 establishments in Alabama
Retail companies disestablished in 1980
1980 disestablishments in Alabama
Companies that filed for Chapter 11 bankruptcy in 1979